One Night Stand is the third studio album by American bluesman Gary B. B. Coleman. The album was released in 1989 by Ichiban Records label.

Track listing

Personnel
Gary B. B. Coleman – harmonica, keyboards, lead guitar, producer
Funky John Cole – bass
Nathaniel Jenkins – drums
Roy Anderson – rhythm guitar
Greg Gould – keyboards

References

1989 albums
Gary B. B. Coleman albums
Ichiban Records albums